Secret Combination may refer to:

 "Secret Combination" (song), by Kalomira 
 Secret Combination: The Album, by Kalomira
 Secret Combination (Randy Crawford album), 1981
 Secret combination (Latter Day Saints), a secret society warned about in the Book of Mormon